Si Mahdjoub District is a district of Médéa Province, Algeria.

The district is further divided into 3 municipalities:
Sidi Mahdjoub
Ouled Bouachra
Bouaichoune

Districts of Médéa Province